Harry Strauss Zelnick (born June 26, 1957) is an American businessman. Born in Boston and raised in South Orange, New Jersey, he attended Columbia High School, Wesleyan University, Harvard Business School, and Harvard Law School. He is the founder, chief executive officer (CEO), and managing partner of private equity firm ZMC, the chairman and CEO of video game company Take-Two Interactive, and the former chairman of media conglomerate CBS Corporation.

Early life and education 
Harry Strauss Zelnick was born on June 26, 1957, in Boston. His mother, Susan Strauss Manello, died on October 22, 1967, when Harry was ten years old. He and his siblings were raised by their aunt Elsa (née Strauss) and her husband Allan Zelnick (died in 2013). He grew up in South Orange, New Jersey.

Strauss Zelnick graduated in 1975 from Columbia High School in Maplewood, New Jersey and studied psychology and English at Wesleyan University from 1975 until 1979, obtaining a Bachelor of Arts degree with honors. During his time at Wesleyan, he was the national public relations director for the Coalition of Independent College and University Students (COPUS). Zelnick simultaneously enrolled at Harvard Business School and Harvard Law School in 1979, obtaining a Master of Business Administration degree from the former in 1982 and a Juris Doctor from the latter in 1983.

Career 
In 1983, he started as vice president for television international sales at Columbia Pictures International Television. In 1986, he joined Vestron Inc. as senior vice president of corporate development. He became executive vice president the following year and was promoted to president in 1988, overseeing all managing operations for the company. He quit in 1989 to join 20th Century Fox as president and CEO before leaving that role in 1993 to join Crystal Dynamics.

Zelnick is the chief executive officer and managing partner of ZMC, a private equity investment firm based in New York City specializing in leveraged buyouts and growth capital. Following an investor-staged takeover of Take-Two Interactive in 2007, Zelnick became the chairman, chief executive officer, and largest single shareholder of Take-Two.

Zelnick was appointed to the board of CBS Corporation in 2018.

In 2021, ZMC purchased a controlling interest in The Second City, a Chicago-based comedy troupe.

Personal life 
Zelnick is Jewish. He has four sisters: Karen Davis, Beth Kaufman, Marci Zelnick Rodriguez, and Laurie Zelnick. His brother, Carl D. Zelnick, died in 1995. Zelnick married Wendy J. Belzberg (the daughter of Samuel Belzberg) in January 1990; their engagement was announced by Belzberg's parents in December 1989. They have two sons, Cooper (born in 1992) and Lucas, as well as a daughter, Leigh.

References 

1957 births
American media executives
Wesleyan University alumni
Harvard Business School alumni
Harvard Law School alumni
Living people
American people of Jewish descent